The 2018 NBA Summer League consisted of three pro basketball leagues organized by the National Basketball Association (NBA): the Sacramento Kings's California Classic Summer League, Utah Jazz Summer League, and Las Vegas Summer League.

The Sacramento Kings hosted their own summer league event called the California Classic at the Golden 1 Center in Sacramento. The event was scheduled to take place before the Las Vegas Summer League began, with the teams in place for the event involving the Kings, Los Angeles Lakers, Golden State Warriors, and Miami Heat. Eight days later, the Kings confirmed that their own Summer League event (titled the California Classic Summer League) would take place July 2–5, 2018 (taking a day off to celebrate the Fourth of July), replacing the Orlando Pro Summer League. On May 14, 2018, the Kings confirmed that report.

Four teams participated in the round-robin format of the Utah Jazz Summer League from July 2 to July 5, 2018. All four teams (Utah Jazz, Atlanta Hawks, Memphis Grizzlies, and San Antonio Spurs) also participated in the Las Vegas Summer League.

The 2018 Las Vegas NBA Summer League was the official 2018 summer league of the National Basketball Association. The league was held at the Thomas and Mack Center and Cox Pavilion in Las Vegas, Nevada, on the campus of University of Nevada, Las Vegas. It began on July 6 and ended on July 17. For the first time in league history, all 30 teams participated. With every team participating, the event expanded to 82 games in 12 days. Teams competed in a tournament-style schedule in three preliminary games before seeding in a tournament; each team played at least five games and as many as eight games. The event concluded with the 2018 NBA Summer League Championship game on July 17.

California Classic
In its first year, the California Classic is scheduled to take place before the Las Vegas Summer League begins, with the teams in place for the event involving the Sacramento Kings, Los Angeles Lakers, Golden State Warriors, and Miami Heat. During the month of May, the Kings confirmed that their own Summer League event (titled the California Classic Summer League) would take place from July 2–5, 2018 (taking a day off to celebrate the Fourth of July), replacing the Orlando Pro Summer League.

Teams
Sacramento Kings
Los Angeles Lakers
Golden State Warriors
Miami Heat

Day 1

Day 2

Day 3

Standings/seedings

Statistical leaders
Reference: 

Points

Rebounds

Assists

Utah Jazz Summer League
Now in its fourth year, the Utah Jazz Summer League will feature six games and host four teams: the Utah Jazz, Atlanta Hawks, Memphis Grizzlies and San Antonio Spurs. Each team will play on July 2, 3 and 5. All games will be played at Vivint Smart Home Arena.

Teams
Memphis Grizzlies
Atlanta Hawks
San Antonio Spurs
Utah Jazz

Utah Schedule
All times are in Mountain Daylight Time (UTC–6)

Day 1

Day 2

Day 3

Standings/seedings

Statistical leaders
Reference: 

Points

Rebounds

Assists

Las Vegas NBA Summer League
The Las Vegas NBA Summer League is the official summer league of the NBA. It is the premier summer league of the three, and it is the first year all 30 teams will be participating in. 82 games were played from July 6 to 17, 2018, across two venues, the Thomas & Mack Center and Cox Pavilion, both located in Paradise, Nevada (near Las Vegas). The Las Vegas NBA Summer League championship featured a rematch of the previous year's teams, the Los Angeles Lakers and the Portland Trail Blazers.

Teams
Atlanta Hawks
Boston Celtics
Brooklyn Nets
Chicago Bulls
Cleveland Cavaliers
Charlotte Hornets
Dallas Mavericks
Detroit Pistons
Denver Nuggets
Golden State Warriors
Houston Rockets
Indiana Pacers
Los Angeles Clippers
Los Angeles Lakers
Memphis Grizzlies
Miami Heat
Milwaukee Bucks
Minnesota Timberwolves
New Orleans Pelicans
New York Knicks
Oklahoma City Thunder
Orlando Magic
Philadelphia 76ers
Phoenix Suns
Portland Trail Blazers
Sacramento Kings
San Antonio Spurs
Toronto Raptors
Utah Jazz
Washington Wizards

Day 1

Day 2

Day 3

Day 4

Day 5

Championship
The championship is determined by a single-elimination tournament; the top 2 teams receive a first-round bye.

Seeding criteria

Teams are seeded first by overall record, then by a tiebreaker system. Coin toss is used if the tiebreakers below fail.
Head-to-head result (applicable only to ties between two teams, not to multiple-team ties)
Quarter point system (1 point for win, .5 for tie, 0 for loss, 0 for overtime periods)
Point differential

First-round losers will play consolation games to determine 17th through 30th places based on the tiebreaker system stated above. Second-round losers will play consolation games to determine 9th through 16th places.

Standings/seedings

Bracket

Tournament schedule
All times are in Eastern Daylight Time (UTC−4)

First round

Second round

Consolation round

Quarterfinals

Semifinals

Championship

Final standings

References

External links
2018 NBA Summer League - NBA.com

Summer League
2018
2018–19 in American basketball by league
2018 in sports in Nevada
July 2018 sports events in the United States
2018 in sports in California
Sports in Utah